Lincoln School is a historic building located in Oskaloosa, Iowa, United States.  Built in 1921, it is a late design of Iowa architect Frank E. Wetherell.  It is believed to be the first modern, single-story school building in the state.  Decorative elements in terracotta are liberally used on the exterior.  The interior follows an open plan that maximized the use of light and air into each classroom.  The gymnasium, manual training, and domestic science areas were rather new concepts for elementary schools when the building was built.  It was listed on the National Register of Historic Places in 1991.

References

School buildings completed in 1921
Oskaloosa, Iowa
Elementary schools in Iowa
Schools in Mahaska County, Iowa
School buildings on the National Register of Historic Places in Iowa
National Register of Historic Places in Mahaska County, Iowa
1921 establishments in Iowa